Verkhnyaya Yentala is a rural locality (a selo) in Yenangskoye Rural Settlement, Kichmengsko-Gorodetsky District, Vologda Oblast, Russia. The population was 197 as of 2002. There are 6 streets.

Geography 
Verkhnyaya Yentala is located 75 km southeast of Kichmengsky Gorodok (the district's administrative centre) by road. Vasino is the nearest rural locality.

References 

Rural localities in Kichmengsko-Gorodetsky District